Josephine Corliss Preston (May 26, 1873 – December 10, 1958) was an American educator and politician who was the first woman elected to state office in Washington. She served as the fifth Washington State Superintendent of Public Instruction from 1913 to 1929.

Early life
Josephine was born on May 26, 1873 in Fergus Falls, Minnesota.  She was the daughter of John Wesley Corliss (1837–1889) and Josephine (nee Kinney) Corliss (1852–1933). Her older sister, Myrtia Permelia Corliss, was the wife of Frank Lewis Phelps. Her father served in Company E and Company K of the 5th Michigan Volunteer Infantry Regiment during the U.S. Civil War and fought in the Battle of Gettysburg.

Her paternal grandparents were Timothy Emerson Corliss and Elvira (nee Hutchins) Corliss.

She received her education at country schools in Minnesota and began teaching in Otter Tail County, Minnesota at the age of fourteen. From 1891 to 1892, she attended the preparatory academy of Carleton College in Northfield, Minnesota.

Career
In 1900, she moved west with her widowed mother, sister and brother and began teaching at the Maple Valley School before becoming the county superintendent of schools in Walla Walla, Washington.  

In 1911, fellow Republican Governor Marion Hay appointed her to the Washington State Board of Education. She was nominated as State Superintendent of Schools in 1912, and was elected to succeed Henry B. Dewey as the Washington State Superintendent of Public Instruction, beating Mary A. Monroe who was an elementary school principal in the Spokane Public Schools. Preston was reelected several times and served in Olympia, Washington until 1928, when she lost the primary to Noah D. Showalter, President of Washington State Normal School at Cheney, who was defeated by Pearl Anderson Wanamaker in the general election.

She was a life member of and a past president of the National Education Association.

After her retirement, she lived for several years in the Burton neighborhood of Vashon Island, Washington.

Personal life
Josephine was briefly married, and divorced, from Herbert P. Preston (1873–1955). While Superintendent, she lived 1502 Columbia St SW, in what is referred to today as the Josephine Corliss Preston House.

Corliss died December 10, 1958 in Renton, Washington. After a funeral service at the Burton Community Church, she was buried at the Mountain View Memorial Park in Tacoma, Washington.

Published works
 Woman and Preparedness (1917)

References

External links
 Josephine Corliss Preston at the Library of Congress.

1873 births
1958 deaths
Washington (state) Superintendents of Public Instruction
American educators
National Education Association people
Women in Washington (state) politics